Elliot Steinmetz (born 1980) is an American real estate lawyer and basketball coach who is currently the head coach of the Yeshiva University Maccabees, under the NCAA Division III bracket.

Coaching career 
He was employed to become a coach for the Hebrew Academy of Nassau County from 2005 until he stepped down from the position in 2010.

On April 28, 2014, he was signed to become the next head coach of the Yeshiva University Maccabees.

From November 2019 until December 2021, his Maccabees won an astounding 50 consecutive victories, but despite that fact, he was quoted having said that: "Honestly, I don’t pay attention, Funny – I knew we have the streak, but we take it one game at time. We have a maturity, and a lot of our top guys are motivated, and that makes my job a lot easier."

In an interview, his philosophical vantage point, when narrowed down in a basketball stance, is not about winning rings, trophies or championships in a general sense, but to aid his team to get better everyday and try to represent the said university and the Jewish community in a positive note.

Legal career 
Steinmetz is a partner at the Long Island based law firm of Rosenberg & Steinmetz PC. A boutique real estate law firm with areas of practice focused on commercial real estate transactions and litigation.

Personal life 
Steinmetz is Jewish. He completed his Juris Doctor (J.D.) degree at St. John's University School of Law in 2005.

His son Jacob Steinmetz is a professional baseball pitcher in the Arizona Diamondbacks organization. He was selected in the third round of the 2021 Major League Baseball draft by the Diamondbacks. He was the first practicing Orthodox Jewish player to be selected by a major league team. He will play for Team Israel in the 2023 World Baseball Classic in Miami, Florida, in March 2023.

Head coaching record 
As of July 10, 2022

|-
| align="left" |Yeshiva Maccabees
| align="left" |2014–15
|25||14||11||  || align="center"| 
|-
| align="left" |Yeshiva Maccabees
| align="left" |2015–16
|27||15||12||  || align="center"| 
|-
| align="left" |Yeshiva Maccabees
| align="left" |2016–17
|25||15||10||  || align="center"| 
|-
| align="left" |Yeshiva Maccabees
| align="left" |2017–18
|29||18||11||  || align="center"| Won Skyline Conference champion
|-
| align="left" |Yeshiva Maccabees
| align="left" |2018–19
|27||19||8||  || align="center"| 
|-
| align="left" |Yeshiva Maccabees
| align="left" |2019–20
|30||29||1||  || align="center"| Won Skyline Conference champion
|-
| align="left" |Yeshiva Maccabees
| align="left" |2020–21
|7||7||0||  || align="center"| Season suspended due to COVID-19 pandemic
|-
| align="left" |Yeshiva Maccabees
| align="left" |2021–22
|29||24||5||  || align="center"| Won Skyline Conference champion
|-class="sortbottom"
| align="center" colspan=2|Career||199|||142|||57||||

References

External links
Elliot Steinmetz coaching profile at Yeshiva University

Living people
1981 births
American men's basketball coaches
College men's basketball head coaches in the United States
Jewish American sportspeople
Yeshiva University